The Chicago, Milwaukee, and St. Paul Railroad Depot in Kadoka, South Dakota, United States, is a rectangular, single story, wood-frame building built by the Chicago, Milwaukee, St. Paul and Pacific Railroad (otherwise known as the Milwaukee Road) in 1906 during the railroad's expansion across South Dakota from Sioux Falls to Rapid City in 1906–07. The depot was built to handle passenger and freight traffic as well as agricultural products. When the railroad went out of business in the mid-1980s, the depot was bought by the Kadoka Community Betterment Association and converted into a museum showcasing artifacts and life on the South Dakota prairie.

The depot was listed in the National Register of Historic Places because of its association with the development of railroads in South Dakota.

References
Prokop, Lois J. (with Melanie Betz), Chicago, Milwaukee, and St. Paul Railroad Depot (Jackson County, South Dakota) National Register of Historic Places Inventory-Nomination Form. On file at the National Register of Historic Places, National Park Service, Washington, D.C. and at the Historic Preservation Office, South Dakota State Historical Society, Pierre, South Dakota.

Railway stations on the National Register of Historic Places in South Dakota
Kadoka, South Dakota
Railway stations in the United States opened in 1906
National Register of Historic Places in Jackson County, South Dakota
1906 establishments in South Dakota
Former railway stations in South Dakota